Paul Alexander McLean (born 13 March 1937) is an Australian advocate of banking reform and former Australian Democrats senator for New South Wales (1987–1991).

Following the announcement of the 1987 Senate election results, McLean was one of four senators who received a six-year term as a consequence of which method was chosen to allocate the seats.

On 12 February 1991, he was prevented by the President of the Senate from tabling sensitive sub-judice documents on the Westpac foreign loans controversy. On 7 March, the President informed the Senate that the documents in question had been ordered to be published by the House of Representatives Standing Committee on Finance and Public Administration, that the Managing Director of Westpac Banking Corporation had indicated to the Committee that the bank would not contest the action to have the injunctions removed, and that in view of these developments, the ruling of 12 February was no longer operative. Senator McLean then tabled the documents by leave.

He resigned his Senate seat on 22 August 1991, in protest against an internal party coup to depose the leader Janet Powell, and was replaced by Karin Sowada.

He is the co-author (with James Renton) of the book Bankers and Bastards (Hudson Publishing, Hawthorn, 1992).

References

1937 births
Australian Democrats members of the Parliament of Australia
Living people
Members of the Australian Senate for New South Wales
Members of the Australian Senate
20th-century Australian politicians